Siyahrud Rural District is a rural district (dehestan) in the Central District of Juybar County, Mazandaran Province, Iran. At the 2006 census, its population was 13,920, in 3,695 families. The rural district has 23 villages.

References 

Rural Districts of Mazandaran Province
Juybar County